Davide Manenti (born 16 April 1989, in Turin) is an Italian sprinter. He competed in the 4 × 100 m relay event at the 2012 Summer Olympics and the 200 m at the 2016 Olympics. He has competed with the Italian national relay team and was a gold medallist in the 4 × 100 metres relay at the 2011 European Athletics U23 Championships and the 2013 Mediterranean Games. He holds a personal best of  	20.44 seconds for the 200 metres.

National records
 4×100 m relay: 38.11 ( Doha, 4 October 2019), he ran third leg in the team with Federico Cattaneo, Marcell Jacobs, Filippo Tortu; current holder

International competitions

1Did not finish in the final

See also
 Italian all-time lists – 200 metres
 Italy national relay team
 Italy at the 2012 Summer Olympics
 Italy at the 2012 European Athletics Championships

References

External links
 

1989 births
Living people
Sportspeople from Turin
Italian male sprinters
Olympic athletes of Italy
Athletes (track and field) at the 2012 Summer Olympics
Athletes (track and field) at the 2016 Summer Olympics
Mediterranean Games gold medalists for Italy
Athletes (track and field) at the 2013 Mediterranean Games
Mediterranean Games medalists in athletics
World Athletics Championships athletes for Italy
Athletics competitors of Centro Sportivo Aeronautica Militare
Italian Athletics Championships winners